How I Built This is an American podcast about "innovators, entrepreneurs, idealists, and the stories behind the movements they built" produced by NPR.

History 
How I Built This began on September 12, 2016, as a podcast where the host, NPR journalist Guy Raz, talks to innovators, entrepreneurs, and idealists, about the stories behind the movements they built.

In 2018, due to the success of the program, Guy Raz launched the "How I Built This Summit" at the Yerba Buena Center for the Arts in San Francisco, California. The event features keynote speakers (many of whom have been featured on the podcast) and networking activities. The event also features career-focused workshops and breakout sessions for pass-holders.

In 2020, Guy Raz released his book How I Built This: The Unexpected Paths to Success from the World's Most Inspiring Entrepreneurs, which highlights key moments and stories from the podcast.

In 2022, How I Built This signed a licensing deal with Wondery, with subsequent radio distribution remaining with NPR.

Episodes

References

External links
 

2016 podcast debuts
Audio podcasts
NPR programs
Technology podcasts